The 2015 Firestone Grand Prix of St. Petersburg was the first round of the 2015 IndyCar Series, the race took place on March 29 in St. Petersburg, Florida, on the city's temporary street course. The race was won by Juan Pablo Montoya with Will Power finishing second, both racing for Team Penske. Tony Kanaan finished third ahead of Hélio Castroneves, and Simon Pagenaud. The top finishing rookie in the race was Gabby Chaves, in 17th position.

Report

Qualifying

Race results

Notes
 Points include 1 point for leading at least 1 lap during a race, an additional 2 points for leading the most race laps, and 1 point for Pole Position.

Championship standings after the race

Drivers' Championship standings

 Note: Only the top five positions are included.

References

External links
 Lap Report – Verizon IndyCar Series, March 29, 2015

Firestone Grand Prix of St. Petersburg
Grand Prix of St. Petersburg
Grand Prix of St. Petersburg
21st century in St. Petersburg, Florida